Brian Walker is a toy inventor from Bend, Oregon who is known for attempting to build his own rocket and as the inventor of several toys, namely the air bazooka.

His rocket is known as Project R.U.S.H., which stands for Rapid Up Super High. It was intended to be fueled by hydrogen peroxide and equipped with parachutes for use when landing. The goal of the project is to launch Walker 50 miles into the sky.  He currently is waiting for approval to launch 20 miles in a rocket-propelled aircraft from the world's largest crossbow.  The crossbow project is now years behind its announced schedule (Fall, 2006).

Walker has been interviewed by several media personalities, including Art Bell on his radio show Coast to Coast AM; novelist Chuck Palahniuk, who included his interview with Walker in his book Stranger Than Fiction: True Stories.

He has been posting videos to his YouTube channel since 2009.

References

Sources
 http://interviews.slashdot.org/interviews/02/07/12/1410203.shtml?tid=160
 Palahniuk, Chuck. Stranger Than Fiction : True Stories. Doubleday, 2004. 
 When Rocket Guy Dreams (St. Petersburg Times, September 2000)
 Interview with Art Bell March 27, 2002

Living people
Year of birth missing (living people)
21st-century American inventors
People from Bend, Oregon